The Chrysler Hemi engines, known by the trademark Hemi, are a series of American V8 gasoline engines built by Chrysler with overhead valve hemispherical combustion chambers. Three different types of Hemi engines have been built by Chrysler for automobiles: the first (known as the Chrysler FirePower engine) from 1951 to 1958, the second from 1964 to 1971, and the third beginning in 2003. Although Chrysler is most identified with the use of "Hemi" as a marketing term, many other auto manufacturers have incorporated similar designs. The engine block and cylinder heads were cast and manufactured at Indianapolis Foundry.

During the 1970s and 1980s, Chrysler also used the Hemi name for their Australian-made Hemi-6 Engine and applied it to the 4-cylinder Mitsubishi 2.6 L engine installed in various North American market vehicles.

Concept 

A hemispherical cylinder head ("hemi-head") gives an efficient combustion chamber with an excellent surface-to-volume ratio, with minimal heat loss to the head, and allows for two large valves. However, a hemi-head allows no more than two valves per cylinder, and these large valves are necessarily heavier than in a multi-valve engine. The intake and exhaust valves lie on opposite sides of the chamber and necessitate a "cross-flow" head design. Since the combustion chamber is a partial hemisphere, a flat-topped piston would yield too low a compression ratio unless a very long stroke is used, so to attain the desired compression ratio the piston crown is domed to protrude into the head at top dead center. The result is a combustion chamber in the shape of the space between where the domed piston stops and the dome shape in the head receiving it.

The hemi-head design places the spark plug at or near the center of the chamber to promote a strong flame front. However, if the hemi-head hemisphere is of equal diameter to the piston, there is minimal squish for proper turbulence to mix fuel and air thoroughly. Thus, hemi-heads, because of their lack of squish, are more sensitive to fuel octane rating; a given compression ratio will require a higher octane rating to avoid pre-detonation in a hemi engine than in some conventional engine designs such as the wedge and bathtub.

The hemi head always has intake and exhaust valve stems that point in different directions, requiring a large, wide cylinder head and complex rocker arm geometry in both cam-in-block and single overhead cam engines (dual overhead cam engines may not have rocker arms). This adds to the overall width of the engine, limiting the vehicles in which it can be installed.

Significant challenges in the commercialization of engine designs using hemispherical chambers revolved around the valve actuation, specifically how to make it effective, efficient, and reliable at an acceptable cost. This complexity was referenced early in Chrysler's development of their 1950s hemi engine: the head was referred to in company advertising as the Double Rocker Shaft head.

World War II
Chrysler developed their first experimental hemi engine for the Republic P-47 Thunderbolt fighter aircraft. The P-47 was already in production with a Pratt & Whitney radial engine when the XIV-2220 flew successfully in trials in 1945 as a possible upgrade, but the war was winding down and it did not go into production. However, the exercise gave Chrysler engineers valuable research and development experience with two-valve hemi combustion chamber dynamics and parameters.

In addition to the aircraft engine, Chrysler and Continental worked together to develop the air-cooled AV-1790-5B V12 Hemi engine used in the M47 Patton tank.

First generation: FirePower
Chrysler applied their military experience with the hemispherical combustion chamber to their first overhead-valve V8 engine, released under the name FirePower, not "Hemi," in 1950 for the 1951 model year. Eventually, three of the four Chrysler divisions had their own version of the FirePower engine, with different displacements and designations, and having almost no parts in common. This lack of commonality was due in part to the three engine versions using different bore pitches (the center-to-center distance between adjacent cylinders). Chrysler and Imperial called their versions the FirePower. DeSoto called theirs the FireDome. Dodge had a smaller version, known as the Red Ram. Only Plymouth did not have a version, but retained the Dodge poly-head engines. There was no Plymouth hemi engine until the 1964 426.

Briggs Cunningham used the Chrysler version in some of his race cars for international motorsports. A Chrysler-powered Cunningham C-5R won its class in 1953. Cunningham switched away from these designs in 1959 when Chrysler temporarily abandoned the hemispherical concept in favor of the wedge-head B engine until 1964. Carl Kiekhaefer also used the Chrysler engines in NASCAR cars owned by him from 1955 and 1956, winning the Grand National Series championship both years.

Collectively, the 1951–1958 Hemi engines are now commonly referred to as first-generation Hemi engines, and the group can be identified by the rear-mounted distributor and the spark plugs in a row down the center of wide valve covers.

1951 Plymouth Hemi V6
There were plans in 1951 for a Plymouth Dual Overhead Cam Hemi V6 displacing  designed by Chrysler's Powerplant Research and Engine Design division. It was meant to be a powerful, fuel-efficient alternative to Ford's V8 and to replace Plymouth's venerable flathead 6.
The plans were scrapped due to build costs and because of the then unusual design.

Chrysler and Imperial 
All Chrysler FirePower engines are oversquare; i.e. their bore is larger than their stroke.

331  
The bore pitch, shared by all Chrysler FirePower engines, was 4.5625", the largest of any 1st generation hemi engines.

The 331 engine was used in the following applications:
 1951–1955 Chrysler New Yorker
 1951–1954 Chrysler Imperial and 1955 Imperial
 1951 Chrysler Saratoga
 1952 Chrysler Saratoga Club Coupe 
 1952 Chrysler Imperial Parade Phaeton
 1955 Chrysler C-300
 1956 Facel Vega FV2B
 The Chrysler air raid siren. At 138 decibels, it is the loudest siren ever made.

354 
The , released in 1956, had a bore of 3.9375 in and stroke of 3.625 in, and the same 10.32" low deck height. For the 300B an optional  version was available, making it the first American V8 to be rated at one horsepower per cubic inch. Note that was before 1972, horsepower was SAE gross. After 1972, horsepower is SAE net.
The 354 was also modified. The hemi was optimized for heavy-duty truck service. These were available with one or two four-barrel carburetors, and were offered in Dodge's heaviest-duty models as the 'Power Giant V-8' from 1957 through 1959; they were the largest of four hemi truck engines offered by Dodge in the 1950s. The 354 was also offered in certain models with polyspheric heads rather than hemi heads. The combustion chambers on these had similarities to both hemi and wedge heads, but were closer in weight to wedge heads. Thus, both 354 poly and 354 hemi V8 engines were variously available in 1957.

The 354 engine was used in the following applications:
 1956 Chrysler New Yorker
 1956 Chrysler 300B
 1956 Imperial Custom & Crown
 1957 Dodge D-501
 1957–1959 Dodge C Series Pickup

392 
The 392 raised-deck engine released in 1957 had a  bore and  stroke. Because its deck was taller, the heads were cast with wider intake ports so that earlier manifolds could be used with the new heads on the new taller block. Due to reliability problems with the primitive onboard computer which controlled the injection system, however, 15 of the 16 300D cars built with the fuel injection option were recalled and retrofitted with carburetors.

The 392 engine was used in the following applications:
 1957–1958 Chrysler New Yorker
 1957–1958 Imperial Custom, Crown, and LeBaron
 1957 Chrysler 300C
 1958 Chrysler 300D
 1958 Facel Vega Excellence (EX)

In the late 1950s and early 1960s, drag racers found the 392 to be a formidable engine and continued to run them competitively into the 1970s. Usual color of the block was silver.

DeSoto 

DeSoto's Hemi engines were called FireDome and served as the naming convention for the DeSoto Firedome sedan.

276 
It was a hot seller, with 50,000 vehicles using the engine until it was replaced in 1954.

291 

330 

341 
The DeSoto Adventurer produced  using dual Carter WCFB four-barrel carburetors.
The 1956 DeSoto Adventurer was the premiere named high-performance version—the DeSoto equivalent of the Chrysler 300—using dual Carter WCFB four-barrel carburetors.
The Adventurer engine for 1956 used a displacement of 341 CID (3.78" bore by 3.80" stroke) and had a compression ratio of 9.5:1, using a special hydraulic camshaft profile.

345 
The largest DeSoto engine for 1957 was the DeSoto Adventurer offering  with square bore and stroke dimensions of 3.80 inches. The compression ratio remained at 9.5:1.

Dodge 
Dodge's Hemi was introduced in 1953 as the Red Ram. Dodge did not have a V8 engine until one was developed specifically for the line in 1953 based on the 1951 Chrysler hemi design, but downsized for these smaller cars. They do not share any major dimensions or components with the larger Chrysler and DeSoto hemi engines, or the Plymouth A engines. From 1955 to 1958 (see 1956 D500 Dodge D-500 cars and packages: early performance cars) lower-performance versions of the Dodge hemi were introduced by substituting less complex poly (single rocker shaft) heads and valve train parts, including one variant only built as a poly (259"). These were used in low-line 1955-58 DeSotos and Dodges, and 1955-56 high-line Plymouths.

Dodge Trucks marketed their version of the Hemi under the name PowerDome.

241 
Dodge introduced the  engine in 1953. With a low compression ratio of 7.0:1 (in 1953 and for the 1954 Meadowbrook), the 241 produced . For 1954, the more senior Dodges received  thanks to a higher 7.5:1 compression ratio. This engine is not the same as the Plymouth 241, which had polyspheric, not hemi heads. The 241 only lasted two years, being replaced by the 270 for 1955.

270 
The D553 1955/1956 Dodge Red Ram Hemi 270 displaced  and was used in premium 1955 and 1956 Dodge vehicles. It was not the same as the 270 poly-head. In the Dodge Coronet, running 7.6:1 compression ratio, the 270 produced . In higher trims like the Dodge Royal, the "Super Red Ram" ran the same compression ratio but with a four-barrel carburetor produced .

315 
But the optional high-performance D-500 version of this engine had a four-barrel carburetor and a larger valved Dodge hemispherical combustion chambered head. Also, a "race only" package called the D-500-1 or DASH 1 was available with a special aluminum dual four-barrel intake that sported a pair of Carter WCFB carburetors similar to the ones on the Chrysler 300B and DeSoto Adventurer. This engine used the same cylinder heads as the base D-500 model.

The D-501 in 57 was the Chrysler 354 engine, not a Dodge-based engine.

325 
Dodge released a  engine for 1957. The "Super Red Ram" engine used a  bore and  stroke.
The base engine offering was now a polyspheric chambered head referenced as 'KDS', and a higher performance 325 was offered with hemi heads as the 'KD-500'. Again there was a low volume offering of a 'KD-500-1' with dual four-barrel carburetors. All engines now, however, had hydraulic camshafts even though the hemi headed offerings sported "dimples" in the valve covers for mechanical adjuster clearance.

Second generation: 426

The hemispherical head design was revived in 1964. These were the first engines officially designated Hemi, a name Chrysler had trademarked. Chrysler Hemi engines of this generation displaced . The 426 Hemi was nicknamed the "elephant engine" at the time, a reference to its high power, heavy weight and large physical dimensions. Its  deck height and  bore spacing made it the biggest engine in racing at the time.

The 426 Hemi of the 1960s was an engine produced for use in NASCAR, as raced in a Plymouth Belvedere in 1964. It was not initially available to the general buying public. The 426 Hemi was not allowed to compete in NASCAR's 1965 season due to its unavailability in production vehicles sold to the general public and because of complaints by Ford regarding its power. However several special production versions of the Dodge Dart, the Plymouth Fury, and later, in 1965, the Dodge Coronet, were produced with aluminum fenders and bumpers for drag racing and made available to the general public.

Chrysler introduced the "Street" Hemi in 1966 for its intermediate range of cars and sold the required number of Hemi engines to the public to homologate its use for stock car racing in NASCAR events in 1966. The "Street Hemi" was similar to the race Hemi but with an inline 2X4-bbl induction system (with automatic choke), lower compression (10.25:1 from 12.5:1) and lower-lift camshaft, with iron exhaust manifolds instead of lighter steel long tube headers.

There were many differences between the Hemi and the Wedge-head big-block, including main cross-bolted bearing caps and a different head bolt pattern. Although all manufacturers were familiar with multi-valve engines and hemispherical combustion chambers, adding more valves per cylinder and designing the complex valvetrain they require were expensive ways of improving the high–revolutions per minute (rpm) breathing of production vehicles. By canting the angle of the NASCAR-mandated two valves per cylinder, significantly larger valves could be used. The Chrysler 426 Hemi and all Chrysler RBs had oversquare bore and strokes.

The 426 Hemi, in "street Hemi" form, was produced for consumer automobiles from 1965 through 1971. Hemi-powered Dodge and Plymouth cars produced in the model years of 1965 through 1971 have become collector's items. For example, a 1971 Plymouth Barracuda Convertible equipped with the 426 Hemi engine sold at auction for US$3.5 million in 2014.

Chrysler's sales literature published both the gross  and net  ratings for 1971.

The street version of the 2G Hemi engine was used (optionally, in all but the last case) in the following vehicles:
 1966–1970 Dodge Coronet/Plymouth Belvedere
 1966–1971 Plymouth Satellite
 1966–1971 Dodge Charger
 1966-1971 Jensen FF
 1966-1971 Jensen Interceptor
 1967–1971 Plymouth GTX
 1968 Dodge Dart Super Stock
 1968 Plymouth Barracuda
 1968–1971 Dodge Super Bee
 1968–1971 Plymouth Road Runner
1969 Dodge Charger R/T
 1969 Dodge Charger Daytona
 1970 Plymouth Superbird
 1970–1971 Plymouth Hemi 'Cuda
 1970–1971 Dodge Challenger
 1970 Monteverdi Hai 450

To avoid confusion with earlier (1951–58) and current Hemi engines, the 426 is sometimes called the "2G" or "Gen 2" Hemi.

In racing
There were many differences between the racing Hemis and the street Hemi, including but not limited to compression ratio, camshaft, intake manifold, exhaust manifold. Some 1960s NASCAR and NHRA Hemi engines featured magnesium cross-ram intake manifolds and magnesium oil pans in an attempt to reduce the massive weight of the overall engine, along with chain-driven internal dry sump oil systems. Today, aftermarket blocks, heads, intakes, rods, and pistons are usually made of aluminum.

The 426 Hemi also was used in NHRA and AHRA drag racing. Its large casting allowed the engine to be overbored and stroked to displacements unattainable in the other engines of the day. Top-fuel racing organizers limited the bore spacing of engines until very recently, when under pressure from Ford and other manufacturers, the bore spacing allowed was increased to —this allows other engines such as the Ford 385 series to begin to compete. The engines based on the old Chrysler design predominate Top Fuel and Funny Car classes due to plentiful parts, a large amount of research and development, as well as decades of experience with the problems of the engine's design. In drag racing today, it is usually equipped with a large Roots type supercharger and short individual exhaust pipes, and fueled with nitromethane. Yet, this variant is used in Top Fuel, Funny Car, and Pro Modified classes.

Third generation: 2003-present

The current-production "HEMI" engine heads are flatter and more complex than the 1950s–'70s Hemi V8 chamber. The combustion chambers are no longer truly hemispherical. It uses a coil-on-plug distributor-less ignition system and two spark plugs per cylinder to shorten flame travel leading to more consistent combustion and reduced emissions. Like most of Chrysler's past-model Hemi-head engines, the 5.7 version is rated at approximately one horsepower per cubic inch (the current engines are SAE net, whereas the old Hemi engines were rated SAE gross). For the 2009 model year power was increased to 357-395 horsepower (266-291 kW) and 389-410 lb·ft (527-556 N·m)  depending on application. It also achieved 4% better fuel economy. Variable valve timing (VVT) was also introduced.

A new variable displacement technology called Multi-Displacement System (MDS) is used in some versions which can shut off two cylinders on each bank under light load to improve fuel economy.

5.7 

The 5.7 L HEMI was released for model year 2003 on the Dodge Ram pickup trucks to supplant the Magnum 5.9 engine.  it was the only available gasoline engine in the Ram Heavy Duty. Chrysler later made the 5.7 L Hemi available in all models of the 2004 Dodge Ram, Dodge Durango, the 2005 Chrysler 300C, Dodge Magnum R/T, Jeep Grand Cherokee, the 2006 Dodge Charger R/T, Jeep Commander, the 2007 Chrysler Aspen, the 2009 Dodge Challenger R/T, and the 2022 Jeep Wagoneer. For manual transmission applications (Challenger and 3/4- and 1-ton Ram pickups), cylinder deactivation is not included.

The 5.7 L Hemi is made at Chrysler's Saltillo Engine plant in Ramos Arizpe, Mexico.

The Hemi was on the Ward's 10 Best Engines list for 2003 through 2007, and again in 2009.

This engine is used in the following vehicles:
 2003–present Ram Pickup
 2004–2009, 2011–Present Dodge Durango
 2005–2008 Dodge Magnum R/T
 2005–present Chrysler 300C, 300S V8 (2010, 2012–Present)
 2005–present Jeep Grand Cherokee
 2006–present Dodge Charger R/T
 2006–2010 Jeep Commander
 2007–2009 Chrysler Aspen
 2009–present Dodge Challenger R/T
 2022–present Jeep Wagoneer

2009 5.7 revisions
Chrysler made various revisions to the 5.7 L for the 2009 model year. The first for all applications is what Chrysler calls Variable Camshaft Timing or VCT. VCT (which is essentially variable valve timing) uses an oil control valve that controls oil flow to a unique camshaft sprocket that contains a phasing device, which depending on the operation of the oil control valve either advances or retards camshaft timing.

Cylinder heads have been revised to increase flow. Though the intake manifold has also been changed on all applications, it is however model specific. Dodge Ram, non-Hybrid Electric Vehicle (HEV) Chrysler Aspens, and non-HEV Dodge Durango utilize an active intake manifold with a short runner valve to optimize torque and horsepower. At lower engine rpm the valve is closed, resulting in improved low-end torque from the longer runners. At higher engine rpm the valve is opened, diverting the incoming air into the center of the manifold. The shorter runners result in improved horsepower. Passenger cars, Jeep vehicles, as well as HEV Chrysler Aspen and HEV Dodge Durango do not use this manifold; instead, these vehicles utilize a passive intake manifold, which does not have a short runner valve. Also, the new cylinder head came with different spark plugs seats: tapered seats was replaced with gasket seats. This change made it impossible to use the old OE Champion RE14MCC4, so the new spark plugs that came with 5.7 HEMI become NGK LZFR5C-11. Besides different seats, new spark plugs got increased gap from .039" (1.0 mm) to .043" (1.1 mm).

Six-speed manual transmission and all Heavy Duty truck applications will differ by not having the Multi-Displacement System (MDS). The new version of the 5.7 L has five different camshaft profiles. All will have VCT.
 Active intake with MDS
 Active intake without MDS
 Passive intake with MDS
 Passive intake without MDS
 HEV Application (modified version of passive intake with MDS)

Power Numbers
 300C/300S V8: , 
 Charger R/T: , 
 Challenger R/T Automatic: , 
 Challenger R/T 6 Speed Manual: , 
 2009-2012 Ram 1500 Truck: , 
 2013+ Ram 1500 Truck: , 
 Ram 2500/3500 Truck: , 
 Jeep Grand Cherokee and Jeep Commander: , 
 2011+ Dodge Durango: , 
 2009 Chrysler Aspen and Dodge Durango non-HEV: , 
 2009 Chrysler Aspen and Dodge Durango HEV: , 
 2022 Jeep Wagoneer: ,

6.1

The Hemi is also available in a  version. The engine block is different from the 5.7, with revised coolant channels and oil jets to cool the pistons. A forged crankshaft, lighter pistons and strengthened connecting rods aid durability. A cast aluminium intake manifold is tuned for high-rpm power and does not include variable-length technology. Chrysler's Multi-Displacement System is not used on the 6.1.

Applications:
 2005–2010 Chrysler 300C SRT-8
 2006–2008 Dodge Magnum SRT-8
 2006–2010 Dodge Charger SRT-8
 2006–2010 Jeep Grand Cherokee SRT-8
 2008–2010 Dodge Challenger SRT-8

6.2 Hellcat
For 2015, Chrysler introduced an all-new high performance supercharged variant of the Hemi engine, called the Hellcat (named after the Grumman F6F Hellcat). The supercharger is a  twin-screw IHI unit with integrated charge coolers, capable of producing  of boost. This engine was the most powerful engine produced by Chrysler as well as the most powerful production engine ever in a muscle car until the Dodge Demon was introduced. This engine is not equipped with Chrysler's Multi-Displacement System. In 2017, Mopar announced that it would sell it as a crate engine under the name Hellcrate. A Redeye version with  debuted in the Dodge Challenger in 2019, followed by the Dodge Charger in 2021.

Applications:
 2015–Present Dodge Challenger SRT Hellcat
 2015–Present Dodge Charger SRT Hellcat
 2018–2021 Jeep Grand Cherokee Trackhawk
 2021 Dodge Durango SRT Hellcat
 2017 Ram 1500 Rebel TRX Concept
 2021–Present Ram 1500 TRX

6.2 Demon
The Demon version of the Hemi V8 features a number of improvements over the Hellcat variant. It is fitted with a larger, 2.7 L twin-screw supercharger, as well as reinforced reciprocating components, a new camshaft, and several other valvetrain upgrades. With these improvements, the Challenger SRT Demon is rated at 808 horsepower on 91-octane pump gasoline, and 840 horsepower when running on 100-octane unleaded racing gasoline. Cooling is aided by a functional Air-Grabber hood scoop, as well as a unique charge cooling system that makes use of the air-conditioning coolant to lower the intake charge air temperature.

Applications:
 2018 Dodge Challenger SRT Demon

6.4 

It is equipped with high-strength forged aluminum alloy pistons. This engine has been available since 2007, as a crate engine under the name 392 HEMI.

The production version of the 392 HEMI was launched in the 2011 Dodge Challenger SRT8 with variable camshaft timing as well as MDS in cars with automatic transmissions. The new 392 HEMI, codenamed "Apache," is based on the third-generation 5.7 L HEMI, codenamed "Eagle," and shares few parts with the 392 crate engine.

Special-Edition Chargers and Challengers equipped with this engine, and the engines themselves, will bear "392 HEMI" badging in commemorative reference to the first-generation engine of the same displacement. In other applications, the engine is badged as "6.4L HEMI".

Applications:

 Chrysler 300 SRT
 Dodge Challenger SRT 392
 Dodge Charger SRT 392
 Dodge Durango SRT
 Jeep Grand Cherokee SRT
 Jeep Grand Wagoneer
 Jeep Wrangler Unlimited Rubicon 392

HD Truck and Cab Chassis version
Starting in model year 2014, the Ram 2500 and 3500 trucks, and Ram 3500, 4500, and 5500 Cab Chassis offered a revised version of the 6.4 L, being re-tuned for better fuel economy and a power band more suitable for hauling and towing than the all-out power of the SRT Version. In 2016 it replaced the 5.7 L as the standard gas engine in the Cab Chassis models.

Power Numbers
 2500 and 3500 Pickup, 3500 SRW Cab Chassis with RFE transmission: , 
 3500 Mega Cab, 3500 DRW Cab Chassis with RFE transmission, 3500 SRW/DRW with Aisin Transmission: , 
 4500 and 5500 Cab Chassis: ,

Mopar 426 HEMI (2012–present)

Mopar 426 HEMI 'Hellephant' (2018-present)
The Hellephant name is a spin on the nickname of the original 426 cubic inch HEMI, Elephant, and the modern Supercharged 6.2L Hellcat HEMIs. It is a crate engine, supercharged as standard, producing 1,000hp and 950lb.-ft of torque.

Marketing
From February to April 2005, DaimlerChrysler hosted a "What Can You HEMI?" contest promoting alternative uses of the HEMI engines. The top five finalists include HEMI Snowblower, HEMI-Go-Round carousel, HEMI on Ice ice resurfacer, HEMI-Shredder, HEMI Big Wheel, i.e. the child's tricycle of the 1970s. The winner was the HEMI Big Wheel, which had a 5.7 L Hemi in the back that was installed backwards, thus reverse became the only forward gear. Plate steel was the predominant material, while a rolled tube of steel had to be utilized for the front tire as there were no such tires  in diameter that were as narrow as needed for this project.

Notes

References

External links

 How a hemi engine works
 A Body Hemi engine swaps
 New Hemi technical article at AutoSpeed
 The Original HEMI
 Mopar HEMI Gen II page
 Mopar HEMI Gen III page

Hemi
V8 engines